John O'Neill (born 30 August 1935) is a former Australian rules footballer who played with Geelong in the VFL. 
 
O'Neill usually played as a wingman or half forward flanker and was often one of his side's biggest disposal getters.

He won a Carji Greeves Medal in 1958 for Geelong's best and fairest player and represented Victoria four times in interstate matches during his career.

He also captained five games for Geelong and after he retired, he became the assistant coach of the club.

External links

1935 births
Australian rules footballers from Victoria (Australia)
Geelong Football Club players
Carji Greeves Medal winners
Warrnambool Football Club players
Living people